Dagny Jørgensen (born 22 March 1929) is a Norwegian alpine skier. She was born in Asker, represented Asker SK, and is the sister of Inger Jørgensen. She participated at the 1952 Winter Olympics in Oslo, where she competed in downhill and giant slalom.

References

External links

1929 births
Living people
People from Asker
Norwegian female alpine skiers
Olympic alpine skiers of Norway
Alpine skiers at the 1952 Winter Olympics
Sportspeople from Viken (county)